Thrinaxoria is a genus of flat-backed millipedes in the family Xystodesmidae. There are at least three described species in Thrinaxoria.

Species
These three species belong to the genus Thrinaxoria:
 Thrinaxoria bifida (Wood, 1864)
 Thrinaxoria lampra (Chamberlin, 1918)
 Thrinaxoria paynei Shelley, 2002

References

Further reading

 
 

Polydesmida
Articles created by Qbugbot